The 1999 Sydney to Hobart Yacht Race, sponsored by Telstra, was the 55th annual running of the "blue water classic" Sydney to Hobart Yacht Race. As in past editions of the race, it was hosted by the Cruising Yacht Club of Australia based in Sydney, New South Wales.  As with previous Sydney to Hobart Yacht Races, the 1999 edition began on Sydney Harbour, at noon on Boxing Day (26 December 1999), before heading south for 630 nautical miles (1,170 km) through the Tasman Sea, past Bass Strait, into Storm Bay and up the River Derwent, to cross the finish line in Hobart, Tasmania.

The 1999 fleet comprised 79 starters of which 49 completed the race and 30 yachts retired.

Results

Line Honours results (Top 10)

Handicap results (Top 10)

References

Sydney to Hobart Yacht Race
S
1999 in Australian sport
December 1999 sports events in Australia
January 2000 sports events in Australia